Giant softshell turtle may refer to the following:

 Asian giant softshell turtle (Pelochelys cantorii), or Cantor's giant softshell turtle
 New Guinea giant softshell turtle (Pelochelys bibroni)
 Northern New Guinea giant softshell turtle (Pelochelys signifera)
 Yangtze giant softshell turtle (Rafetus swinhoei)
 Pelochelys, the genus of giant softshell turtles
 Axestemys, an extinct genus of softshell turtle

See also
 Softshell turtle

Pelochelys
Rafetus
Animal common name disambiguation pages